Krotov is a Russian male surname. Its feminine counterpart is Krotova. It may refer to:
Aleksandr Krotov (footballer, born 1895), Russian association football player
Aleksandr Krotov (footballer, born 1997), Russian association football player
Alyaksandr Krotaw (born 1995), Belarusian football player
Mikhail Krotov (born 1963), Russian lawyer and businessman
Mykola Krotov (1898–1978), Ukrainian association football player
Pavel Krotov (born 1992), Russian freestyle skier
Vyacheslav Krotov (born 1993), Russian association football player
Yakov Krotov (born 1957), Russian essayist, historian, radio host and priest
Zinaida Krotova (born 1923), Russian speed skater

See also
Krotov culture

Russian-language surnames